Dermot Noel Kelly (25 December 1932 – 22 February 2023) was an Irish hurler. He lined out at club level with Claughaun and also played at inter-county level with Limerick.

Career

Kelly first played hurling as a schoolboy with CBS Sexton Street in the Harty Cup. He later lined out as a dual player with the Claughaun club and won three Limerick SHC medals and two Limerick SFC medals.

Kelly first appeared on the inter-county scene with Limerick during a two-year stint with the minor team in 1949 and 1950. He immediately progressed on the senior team in 1951. Kelly enjoyed his greatest success with Limerick when he scored 1–12 to beat Clare in the 1955 Munster final. He continued to line out with Limerick until 1959. Kelly also earned selection to the Munster team and won four Railway Cup medals in six seasons.

Personal life and death

As well as his sporting career, Kelly was also known as a songwriter and performer. He was also a member of the College Players Limerick in the 1950s and was a member of Conradh na Gaeilge. Kelly worked with the Bank of Ireland.

Dermot was a renowned Irish ballad songwriter and composed many notable tunes including The Ballad Of Joseph McHugh about the famous Publican from Liscannor, County Clare.

Kelly is a past Captain and President of Lahinch Golf Club.
 

Kelly died on 22 February 2023, at the age of 90.

Honours

Claughaun
Limerick Senior Football Championship: 1955, 1959
Limerick Senior Hurling Championship: 1957, 1958, 1968

Limerick
Munster Senior Hurling Championship: 1955

Munster
Railway Cup: 1955, 1957, 1958, 1960

References

1932 births
2023 deaths
Claughaun hurlers
Claughaun Gaelic footballers
Limerick inter-county hurlers
Munster inter-provincial hurlers